Matheus Alvarenga de Oliveira (born 16 August 1999), known as Matheus Davó, is a Brazilian professional footballer who plays as a forward for Cruzeiro.

Youth
Born in São Paulo, he earned the nickname, Davó, which means "Grandma's" in Portuguese, due to his grandmother's intense participation in his career. She was responsible for taking him to games and training, which set him apart from other boys who played on his team at Clube do Magrão. He said, "I stayed with my grandmother during the week, my parents worked. She was the one who took me to training and to school. As they had many Matheus, that was what differentiated Matheus Davó. When I arrived at the first kindergarten, I didn't know my last name, the guys asked what it was and I said "Davó"." Then he took it, he stayed with Davó for the rest of his life. His youth career included stint at Joinville and Portuguesa.  His 2017 performance on the Portuguesa U17 team resulted in scoring 12 goals in 23 games and led to interest from Guarani as his former Portuguesa coach Marcio Zanardi had just joined the team.

Club career

Guarani
Davó joined Guarani and its U20 team in March 2018, from Portuguesa. On 17 January 2019, after impressing in the year's Copa São Paulo de Futebol Júnior by scoring 6 goals in 8 games including 4 goals in a 5–0 win against Internacional, he renewed his contract with the club for three years. Davó made his professional debut in Campeonato Brasileiro Série B on 28 May 2019, coming on as a second-half substitute in a 2–1 home loss against Brasil de Pelotas. He scored his first goal on 29 July 2019 netting the equalizer in a 1–1 away draw against Sport. He would finish the season scoring 3 goals and 1 assist in 30 games.

Corinthians
With teams such as Santos FC and Cruzeiro also having interest in Davó, Corinthians acquired 60% of Davó's economic rights for 2.5M R$ (approximately $650,000), citing his speed, ability to play anywhere across the forward positions and clinical finishing, and signed him to a four-year contract through 2023. His contract announcement was made on 20 January 2020 at the University of Central Florida, where the team was in preseason training for the Florida Cup. Davó made his first appearance as a substitute on 16 January 2020 in a 2–1 win over New York City FC. He made his first competitive appearance on 26, January 2020 in a 1–1 tie with Mirassol in the Paulista Série A2. In limited appearances, he was impressive in Campeonato Brasileiro Série A, scoring 2 goals in 4 games, including the game-winner in his debut on 30 October 2020 in his team's 1–0 win over Internacional. He scored again in his 3rd game, a 2–1 loss to Atlético Mineiro. In his 4th and last appearance against Grêmio, manager Vagner Mancini substituted him during the first half, citing he was not properly reading the game from a tactical basis. Davó did not play any of the remaining games of the season.

During 2020, Davó's transfer to Corinthians was reviewed twice in the Brazilian courts. Prior to his transfer to Corinthians, Davó's economic rights were held by Guarani and his player agency, Elenko Sports Management after rights were formerly held by his former agency, Gold Sports. In order to get out of his contract with Guarani for its economic rights, he had to make a 700,000 R$ termination payment  that was deposited with a 3rd party that was at odds with FIFa's position on 3rd party transactions. In a July 2020 decision, the 9th Civil Court of Campinas ruled that Davó's transfer was ruled as fraud that could have made the transfer ineffective. In a November 2020, the 5th Civil Court of Campinas overturned the previous decision and the transfer remained in effect with Davó's economic rights being held by Corinthians 60%, Guarani 20% and Davó 20%.

Guarani
After declining the option of training with Corinthians U23 team for remainder of the 2021 season, Davó returned to Guarani on loan through the end of 2021. His transfer situation addressed in the courts in 2020 caused additional delays in getting him registered to be able to play in 2021; however, the 7th Civil Court of Campinas allowed him to be registered for the 2021 season. He played in the Paulista Série A2, scoring 1 goal and 2 assists in 8 games, and then Campeonato Brasileiro Série B, scoring 2 goals and 3 assists in 14 games, before announcing his early departure in July 2021  for an expected loan move to Philadelphia Union.

Philadelphia Union
On 11 August 2021, Davó joined Major League Soccer club Philadelphia Union on loan for the remainder of the 2021 season, with the Union having an option the purchase at the end of the season. His loan expired following the club's 2021 season.

Career statistics

References

External links
 
 

1999 births
Living people
Footballers from São Paulo
Brazilian footballers
Association football forwards
Campeonato Brasileiro Série A players
Campeonato Brasileiro Série B players
Major League Soccer players
Guarani FC players
Sport Club Corinthians Paulista players
Philadelphia Union players
Esporte Clube Bahia players
Cruzeiro Esporte Clube players